Sally Hunter (born 13 April 1985), née Sally Foster, is an Australian breaststroke swimmer.  She won the silver medal in the 200-metre breaststroke event at the 2008 FINA Short Course World Championships.  Hunter is an Australian Institute of Sport scholarship holder. She competed in the 200-metre breaststroke at the 2008 Summer Olympics in Beijing and at the 2012 Summer Olympics in London, reaching the final in 2012.  She won the silver medal in the 200 m breaststroke at the 2014 Commonwealth Games, and was a member of Australia's gold-medal-winning 4×100-metre medley relay team.

References

External links
 
 
 
 
 
 

1985 births
Living people
Australian female breaststroke swimmers
Australian female freestyle swimmers
Australian Institute of Sport swimmers
Commonwealth Games gold medallists for Australia
Commonwealth Games silver medallists for Australia
Medalists at the FINA World Swimming Championships (25 m)
Olympic swimmers of Australia
Swimmers at the 2008 Summer Olympics
Swimmers at the 2012 Summer Olympics
Swimmers at the 2014 Commonwealth Games
World Aquatics Championships medalists in swimming
Commonwealth Games medallists in swimming
20th-century Australian women
21st-century Australian women
Medallists at the 2014 Commonwealth Games